"Kick It in the Sticks" is a song co-written and recorded by American country music singer Brantley Gilbert. It was originally released in 2010 and re-released in 2012 as a single from his album Halfway to Heaven via the Valory Music Group.  The song was by Gilbert, along with Rhett Akins and Ben Hayslip.

Critical reception
Billy Dukes of Taste of Country gave the song five stars out of five, writing that "while the aggressive guitars and spoken-word delivery can be intimidating, Gilbert's message couldn't be more welcoming."

T. Ballard Lesemann, writing for the Charleston City Paper, described the 2010 version as "an authentic redneck anthem that touches all the clichés", and compared it to grunge and nu-metal.

Music video 
The music video, which was made for the 2010 version, was directed by Potsy Ponciroli. It depicts a rowdy party in the woods. T. Ballard Lesemann, writing for the Charleston City Paper, described as looking like "something Kid Rock might have directed."

Charts and certifications (2012 version)
The 2010 release of "Kick It in the Sticks" had failed to chart, but the 2012 rendition went to number 29 on the U.S. Billboard Hot Country Songs chart and number 38 on the Country Airplay chart.

Chart performance

Certifications

References

2010 debut singles
2012 singles
2010 songs
Brantley Gilbert songs
Big Machine Records singles
Songs written by Brantley Gilbert
Songs written by Rhett Akins
Songs written by Ben Hayslip
Song recordings produced by Dann Huff